Dechlorane plus (abbrev. DDC-CO) is a polychlorinated flame retardant produced by Oxychem. Its log P is 11.27±0.94. It is produced by the Diels-Alder reaction of two equivalents of hexachlorocyclopentadiene with one equivalent of cyclooctadiene. The syn and anti isomer are formed in the approximate ratio of 1:3.

Dechlorane plus was first found in the environment in 2006 in air around the Great Lakes. Since then, its environmental occurrence has been further documented in several studies including sediments of the Great Lakes; zooplankton, fish, and mussels in Lake Winnipeg and Lake Ontario; air and seawater from the Arctic to Antarctica; and Chinese air. Modeling data indicates that Dechlorane Plus may be persistent, bioaccumulative, and subject to long-range transport and that it may be candidates for Annex D evaluation under the United Nations Stockholm Convention on Persistent Organic Pollutants.

Dechlorane plus was added to the list of REACH Substances of Very High Concern on January 15, 2018.

Literature

References 

Organochlorides